Raiz may refer to:
Raiz, Iran
a capoeira technique; see List of capoeira techniques#Raiz
Raíz (album), a 2014 album by singers Lila Downs, Niña Pastori and Soledad Pastorutti
 Raiz, a 2013 album by fado singer Cuca Roseta
 Raiz (Bagram detainee)
Raiz (company) an Australian Micro-investments app